Iris pallida, the Dalmatian iris or sweet iris, is a hardy flowering perennial plant of the genus Iris, family Iridaceae. It is native to the Dalmatian coast (Croatia) but widely naturalised elsewhere. It is a member of the subgenus Iris, meaning that it is a bearded iris, and grows from a rhizome.

Description
This iris prefers rocky places in the Mediterranean and Submediterranean zone and reaches sometimes montane regions at its southern range in Montenegro. The inflorescence, produced in May/June, is fan-shaped and contains two or three flowers which are usually pale purplish to whitish.

Cultivation
It is cultivated as a garden plant, and commercially for extraction of essential oils from its rhizome (orris root).

The variegated cultivar 'Variegata' has gained the Royal Horticultural Society's Award of Garden Merit.

Subspecies
Three subspecies of Iris pallida s.l. are recognised by some authors as species: Iris pallida subsp. cengialti, (with deep purplish flowers) from Slovenia and adjacent Italy, Iris pallida ssp. illyrica, from the North Dalmatian coast, and Iris pallida ssp. pseudopallida from the South Dalmatian coast.

References

pallida
Endemic flora of Croatia
Garden plants of Europe
Taxa named by Jean-Baptiste Lamarck